Pudgy and the Lost Kitten is a 1938 Fleischer Studios animated short film starring Betty Boop.

Synopsis
Myron the kitten and his mother, from a previous Betty Boop cartoon called Happy You and Merry Me make a return appearance.

References

External links
Pudgy and the Lost Kitten on Youtube.
Pudgy and the Lost Kitten at www.fleischerstudios.com.
 

1938 short films
Betty Boop cartoons
1930s American animated films
American black-and-white films
1938 animated films
Paramount Pictures short films
Fleischer Studios short films
Short films directed by Dave Fleischer
Animated films about cats
Animated films about dogs
1950s English-language films